Cologne II is an electoral constituency (German: Wahlkreis) represented in the Bundestag. It elects one member via first-past-the-post voting. Under the current constituency numbering system, it is designated as constituency 94. It is located in western North Rhine-Westphalia, comprising the southwestern part of the city of Cologne.

Cologne II was created for the inaugural 1949 federal election. Since 2021, it has been represented by Sven Lehmann of the Alliance 90/The Greens.

Geography
Cologne II is located in western North Rhine-Westphalia. As of the 2021 federal election, it comprises the southwestern part of the independent city of Cologne, specifically the districts of Rodenkirchen, Lindenthal, and the Stadtteile of Altstadt-Süd and Neustadt-Süd from Innenstadt.

History
Cologne II was created in 1949. In the 1949 election, it was North Rhine-Westphalia constituency 8 in the numbering system. From 1953 through 1961, it was number 67. From 1965 through 1998, it was number 60. From 2002 through 2009, it was number 95. Since the 2013 election, it has been number 94.

Originally, the constituency comprised the area of Cologne on the left bank of the Rhine south of the line made by Aachener Straße and Innere Kanalstraße. In the 1965 through 1976 elections, it comprised Bayenthal, Zollstock, Klettenberg, Sülz, Lindenthal, Müngersdorf, and Ehrenfeld south of Subbelrather Straße. In the 1980 through 1998 elections, it comprised Rodenkirchen and Lindenthal. It acquired its current borders in the 2002 election.

Members
The constituency was first represented by Hermann Pünder of the Christian Democratic Union (CDU) from 1949 to 1957, followed by fellow CDU members Fritz Hellwig until 1961 and Carl Hesberg until 1969. It was won by the Social Democratic Party (SPD) in 1969 and represented by Katharina Focke. She was succeeded in 1980 by Anke Fuchs for a single term. The CDU regained the constituency in 1983, and Heribert Blens served from then until 1998, when former member Fuchs was elected representative for another term. She was succeeded by in 2002 by fellow SPD member Lale Akgün. Michael Paul of the CDU won the constituency in 2009 and served until 2013. Heribert Hirte was elected in 2013 and re-elected in 2017. Sven Lehmann of the Greens won the constituency in 2021.

Election results

2021 election

2017 election

2013 election

2009 election

References

Federal electoral districts in North Rhine-Westphalia
Politics of Cologne
Constituencies established in 1949
1949 establishments in West Germany